Bruno Gutzeit (born March 2, 1966 in Orléans, Loiret) is a retired butterfly swimmer from France, who represented his native country at two consecutive Summer Olympics, starting in 1988. He won three silver medals at the 1989 European Long Course Championships in Bonn, West Germany.

References
 
 

1966 births
Living people
French male freestyle swimmers
French male butterfly swimmers
Swimmers at the 1988 Summer Olympics
Swimmers at the 1992 Summer Olympics
Olympic swimmers of France
Place of birth missing (living people)
European Aquatics Championships medalists in swimming
Sportspeople from Orléans
20th-century French people
21st-century French people